Alfiya Kogogina (born February 26, 1969, Zelenodolsk, Republic of Tatarstan) is a Russian political figure and deputy of the 6th, 7th, and 8th State Dumas. 

From 1992 to 1999, she was the Chief Specialist and the Head of the Department of Economics, Financial Analysis and Forecasting, Head of the Department of Marketing and Investment Policy in the Administration of the Zelenodolsk District and the City of Zelenodolsk. On December 23, 2002, she was appointed the director of sales and leasing development at the Kamaz. In 2011, she was elected deputy of the 6th State Duma from the Tatarstan constituency. In 2016 and 2021, she was re-elected deputy of the 7th and 8th State Dumas respectively.

References

1968 births
Living people
Tatar people of Russia
United Russia politicians
21st-century Russian politicians
Eighth convocation members of the State Duma (Russian Federation)
Seventh convocation members of the State Duma (Russian Federation)
Sixth convocation members of the State Duma (Russian Federation)
Russian Presidential Academy of National Economy and Public Administration alumni